Šumećani is a naselje (settlement) in Zagreb County, Croatia, close to Zagreb and part of the town of Ivanić-Grad. Šumećani covers an area of  and according to the 2011 census, it had 494 inhabitants.

History

References 

Populated places in Zagreb County